Live from Austin, Texas is a live album released by rock musician David Byrne, released on New West Records on October 2, 2007 on CD and DVD. The songs were recorded during Byrne's 2001 tour in support of Look into the Eyeball at a date for the KLRU television show Austin City Limits. Except for the first 4 songs the quartet was accompanied by the Austin-based tango string sextet Tosca.

The album not only includes songs from his solo work, but also several Talking Heads songs and a Whitney Houston cover, "I Wanna Dance with Somebody (Who Loves Me)."

Track listing
All tracks written by David Byrne except as indicated.
"(Nothing But) Flowers" (David Byrne, Chris Frantz, Jerry Harrison, Tina Weymouth) – 4:50
"God's Child (Come Dance with Me)" – 4:35
"And She Was" (Byrne, Frantz, Harrison, Weymouth) – 3:39
"Once in a Lifetime" (Byrne, Brian Eno, Frantz, Harrison, Weymouth) – 7:14
"The Great Intoxication" – 4:10
"Marching Through the Wilderness" (Byrne, John Pacheco) – 4:19
"The Revolution" – 2:24
"This Must Be the Place (Naive Melody)" – 5:50
"What a Day That Was" – 6:51
"Desconocido soy" – 2:56
"Like Humans Do" – 4:15
"Life During Wartime" (Byrne, Frantz, Harrison, Weymouth) – 6:30
"I Wanna Dance with Somebody (Who Loves Me)" (George Merrill, Shannon Rubicam) – 5:07

Personnel
David Byrne – Vocals and guitar
Paul Frazier – bass guitar and vocals
Mauro Refosco – percussion, percussion programming, and mallets
David Hilliard – drums
String sextet Tosca (tracks 5–13)
Leigh Mahoney – violin
Lara Hicks – violin
Jamie Desautels – violin
Stephanie Ames Asbell – viola and vocals
Ben Westney – cello
Sara Nelson – cello

Release history

External links
Live from Austin, Texas on homepage DavidByrne.com

David Byrne live albums
2007 video albums
Live video albums
2007 live albums
New West Records live albums
New West Records video albums
David Byrne video albums
Austin City Limits